Pseudaletis camarensis is a butterfly in the family Lycaenidae. It is found in Cameroon, the Central African Republic and the Democratic Republic of the Congo.

Subspecies
Pseudaletis camarensis camarensis (Cameroon, Central African Republic)
Pseudaletis camarensis depuncta Libert, 2007 (north-eastern Democratic Republic of the Congo)

References

Butterflies described in 2007
Pseudaletis